Roy Vickers may refer to:

 Roy Henry Vickers, Canadian artist
 William Edward Vickers, British mystery writer who used the pseudonym Roy Vickers